Lennart Anderson (August 22, 1928 – October 15, 2015) was an American painter. His work has been featured at several major museums, including his first major show at the Delaware Art Museum in 1992. He taught on the art faculties of several universities, including Brooklyn College, the Pratt Institute, Yale University, Princeton University, and Columbia University.

Born in Detroit, Michigan, he studied at Cass Technical High School, the School of the Art Institute of Chicago, the Cranbrook Academy of Art, and the Art Students League of New York under Edwin Dickinson. Anderson was inducted as a member of the American Academy and Institute of Arts and Letters in 1977 and made an Associate of the American Academy of Design in 1982. He was a recipient of the Guggenheim Fellowship (1983), the National Endowment for the Arts grant, the Louis Comfort Tiffany Foundation grant, and in 1961 was awarded the Rome Prize.

His paintings and drawings are included in the collections of the Brooklyn Museum; the Museum of Fine Arts, Boston; Hirshhorn Museum and Sculpture Garden; Cleveland Museum of Art; the Whitney Museum of American Art; and the Louis-Dreyfus Family Collection.

References

1928 births
2015 deaths
Painters from New York City
Brooklyn College faculty
Pratt Institute faculty
Yale University faculty
Princeton University faculty
Columbia University faculty
Artists from Detroit
Deaths from cancer in New York (state)
Deaths from prostate cancer
Artists from Brooklyn
Cranbrook Academy of Art alumni
Cass Technical High School alumni
Members of the American Academy of Arts and Letters